Dark Justice is an American crime drama television series about a judge who becomes a vigilante by night so that he can bring high-level offenders who use technicalities to "escape" the legal system to what he calls "dark justice." The role of Judge Nicholas Marshall was played by actors Ramy Zada (1991) and Bruce Abbott (1992–1993).

The series began airing on April 5, 1991 and ran for three seasons (66 episodes) finishing on September 28, 1993.

Production and filming 
During the first season, the series was shot in Barcelona, Catalunya, Spain. Before the second season, the series had to switch locations due to budget constraints caused by the 1992 Summer Olympics. The second and third seasons were shot in Los Angeles, California.

Actor Ramy Zada, who played the lead role of Judge Nicholas Marshall during the first season, was said to be unavailable for the second season due to the location change, and Bruce Abbott was chosen as his replacement. The location was also the main reason behind the casting of some Spanish actors like Begoña Plaza in lead roles. When the series shifted to Los Angeles, Janet Gunn permanently assumed the role of the female member of "The Night Watchmen," Kelly Cochrane.

Gunn later starred for three seasons as Cassandra St. John in Silk Stalkings, another Crimetime After Primetime drama, after it had moved exclusively to the USA Network.

Plot synopsis 
Nicholas Marshall, a former police officer and district attorney, is a judge who loses his faith in the legal system after his wife and daughter are murdered in a car bombing intended for him. After the killer walks free due to a technicality, Marshall becomes a vigilante by night, dedicated to bringing what he calls "dark justice" to criminals who evade penalties due to technicalities. Marshall had already had his faith in the legal system shaken even before his wife and his daughter were murdered:
 as a youth, growing up in an unnamed ghetto in an unspecified city, his father was murdered by a hoodlum with local connections;
 as a police officer, technicalities often voided his arrests;
 as a prosecutor, having obtained his law degree through night school studies, crooked defenders would sometimes undermine his prosecutions; and
 after his election to a judgeship, the letter of the law often bound his hands.

To help him achieve his goal, Marshall uses a team of specialists whom the local press refers to as "The Night Watchmen." The team, a civilian counterpart to the mission teams of the governmental Impossible Missions Force, consists of people who were prosecuted for lower-level offenses, and who help him with some tasks; this can be seen as a form of community service for their offenses. The members of the watchmen were Arnold "Moon" Willis (Dick O'Neill), who had once been a con man; Jericho "Gibs" Gibson (Clayton Prince), a special effects expert; and a female companion that changed several times during the three seasons. Kelly Cochrane (Janet Gunn) was a rape victim whose attackers had been acquitted in Marshall's court. After she killed one of her attackers, Marshall added her to the team; she remained until the end of the series.

Marshall would typically target criminals whom he had encountered in his courtroom, but whom he was forced to release for technical reasons of one kind or another. Marshall would generally dismiss these defendants with the warning, "Justice may be blind, but it can see in the dark." He would then assume his alter ego as a long-haired, leather jacket-wearing, motorcycle-riding vigilante. His team would construct an elaborate sting operation, usually involving undercover work and even special effects. These operations were designed to elicit a confession from the criminal or otherwise trip him or her up so that courtroom-admissible (and/or technicality-resistant) evidence either of the original crime or of a different crime could be gathered.

Unfortunately for the Night Watchmen, the very police department in which Marshall himself had once served came to view them as criminals, and their crusade as illegal. By the time of the series conclusion, even the FBI had commenced to look into the activities of the Night Watchmen, a probe Marshall was, presumably, able to defuse when a federal agent provided him with the FBI file on the Night Watchmen.

Cast 
Ramy Zada - Judge Nicholas Marshall (1991)
Bruce Abbott - Judge Nicholas Marshall (1992–1993)
Janet Gunn - Kelly Cochrane (1992–1993)
Dick O'Neill - Arnold "Moon" Willis (1991–1993)
Clayton Prince - Jericho "Gibs" Gibson (1991–1993)
Begoña Plaza - Catalana "Cat" Duran (1991)
Viviane Vives - Maria Marti (1991)
Kit Kincannon - District Attorney Ken Horton (1991–93)
Carrie-Anne Moss - Tara McDonald (1991–1993)
Elisa Heinsohn - Samantha "Sam" Collins (1993)

Episode list
 Nº = Overall episode number
 Ep = Episode number by season

Season 1: 1991–92

Season 2: 1992–93

Season 3: 1993

External links

1991 American television series debuts
1993 American television series endings
1990s American crime drama television series
CBS original programming
English-language television shows
Television series by Warner Bros. Television Studios
Television shows filmed in Spain
Television shows filmed in Los Angeles
Vigilante television series